, branded as Chocorooms in the United States, is a Japanese snack food produced by Meiji Seika. It is made in the shape of little mushrooms. Kinoko means "mushroom" and yama means "mountain". The "stem" of the mushroom is made of a biscuit-type cookie and the top is made of chocolate. Although chocolate is the most common flavor, it may come in many other flavors.

It was first sold in 1975.

References

Further reading 
 

Candy
Japanese snack food